Liga Deportiva Universitaria de Quito's 2015 season was the club's 86th year of existence, the 63rd year in professional football, and the 55th in the top level of professional football in Ecuador.

Club

Personnel
President: Carlos Arroyo
Honorary President: Rodrigo Paz
President of the Executive Commission: Esteban Paz
President of the Football Commission: Edwin Ripalda
Vice-President of the Football Commission: Patricio Torres
Sporting manager: Santiago Jácome

Coaching staff
Manager: Álex Aguinaga
Assistant manager: Pablo Marín, Luis Leguizamón, Franklin Salas
Physical trainer: Javier Solís
Goalkeeper trainer: Luis Preti

Kits
Supplier: Umbro
Sponsor(s): Chevrolet, Powerade, Discover, DirecTV, Roland

Squad information
Liga's squad for the season is allowed a maximum of four foreign players at any one time, and a maximum of six throughout the season. The jersey numbers in the main table (directly below) refer to the number on their domestic league jersey.

Note: Caps and goals are of the national league and are current as of the beginning of the season.

Winter transfers

Summer transfers

Competitions

Pre-season friendlies

Serie A

The 2016 season was Liga's 55th season in the Serie A and their 15th consecutive. The format is identical to the previous season.

First stage

Second stage

Copa Libertadores

L.D.U. Quito qualified to the 2016 Copa Libertadores—their 17th participation in the continental tournament—as the runner-up of the 2015 Serie A. They entered the competition in the second stage and were placed in Group 6 with San Lorenzo, Grêmio and Toluca.

Copa Libertadores squad

Second stage

Player statistics

Note: Players in italics left the club mid-season.

Team statistics

References

External links
 Official Site 

2016
Ecuadorian football clubs 2016 season